The Henson-Hizon House is a heritage house in the City of San Fernando, Pampanga, Philippines. This Bahay na Bato of the Spanish colonial period was declared a Heritage House by the National Historical Institute on 27 January 2003 by virtue of Resolution No. 3, S. 2003.

History
The house was built by the Saturnino Henson y David, gobernadorcillo of San Fernando from 1882-1883 and 1896 and the first tesorero municipal (municipal treasurer) from 1900-1902, and his wife Maria Lacson.  It was inherited by their eldest daughter Juana Henson y Lacson who was married to Florentino Hizon.  It was then inherited by their son Vicente Hizon y Henson who was married to Concepcion Dizon y Dayrit, then inherited by their son Vicente Hizon y Dizon who was married to Anastacia de los Reyes. The house was purchased by the couple Pablo Panlilio y Dayrit and Dolores Argüelles. Next to the house is a monument dedicated to the heroic efforts of Nicolasa Dayrit, mother of Pablo Panlilio, a local heroine who helped the wounded and sick Filipino fighters during the Filipino-American War.

References

Buildings and structures in San Fernando, Pampanga
Landmarks in the Philippines
Heritage Houses in the Philippines